Anne-Kathrin Peitz (born March 5, 1972) is a German documentary screenwriter, director and producer. She primarily works on classical music-related documentaries and television specials.

Education and early career
Anne-Kathrin Peitz studied English literature and Theatre in Leeds (Bachelor of Arts at University of Leeds) and Berlin (Master's degree at the Technische und Freie Universität Berlin). She resides in Leipzig.

Peitz initially worked as a journalist for the Berliner Zeitung, the Leipziger Volkzeitung and other German publications as well as English language newspapers. She later became the product manager for WERGO, the recording label for new music at Schott Music publishers. She combined her love of music and writing to serve as head of Public Relations at the state opera houses in Leipzig and Stuttgart.

Film, television and documentary work
While working at the Staatsoper Stuttgart, Peitz was to first delve into documentary making by initiating The Singing City, a cinema documentary about the everyday life of a German opera house (she was the production manager for the film). The film won the Basler Filmpreis in 2011.

Since 2011 Peitz works as a producer and writer for works including the multiple award-winning documentary John Cage – Journeys in Sound (WDR). Her debut as a director came in 2012 with her documentary series Sounds of the Sidewalk – On the Road with Buskers (ZDF/Arte).

Anne-Kathrin Peitz has directed numerous award-winning productions for television (ZDF/Arte/WDR).   Her music documentaries have been viewed throughout the world at film festivals and on numerous broadcast stations (e.g. YLE, Svt, NRK, NHK, EVT, Brava, RAI, SF). Her expertise has been recognized in directing documentaries on subject matter of classical music and Avant-garde trends in the genre. Peitz's primary work has been for the German production company Accentus Music (GmbH); most of her films have been released on DVD under the label Accentus Music.

Her directorial work on Satiesfictions – Promenades with Erik Satie (WDR/Arte) earned her a nomination for the Grimme-Preis in 2016 and also received the ARD television programming award.   ”Befitting its extraordinary subject, Anne-Kathrin Peitz and Youlian Tabakov’s brilliant film about the French composer and hardline agent provocateur Erik Satie aims at more than a standard life-and-works biography”, notes Philip Clark from Gramophone magazine.

Peitz's 2016 film Silenced – Composers in Revolutionary Russia (WDR/Arte) won the 2017 Czech Crystal for “Best Documentary” at Golden Prague Festival. The film looks at Russian composers of the early twentieth century: The fates of young rebels such as Arthur Lourié, Nikolai Roslavets, Alexander Mosolov, Sergei Prokofiev and Leon Theremin or Arseny Avraamov reveal much about the early Soviet Union's cultural life, the hopeful and then tragic entanglement of art and politics to which so many artists fell victim during the First World War, the October Revolution, and the rule of Joseph Stalin. Peitz's film seeks to rediscover composers long banished and forgotten.

The Unanswered Ives – Pioneer in American Music (WDR/Arte) features perhaps the most famous “weekend composer” of musical history. Having been a businessman in the insurance sector and composing revolutionary twelve-tone music Charles Ives (1874-1954) is regarded today as the first composer of the modern age in America. Peitz's profound exploration of this extraordinary, multi-faceted personality is awarded again the Czech Crystal for “Best Documentary” at Golden Prague Festival in 2019.   

Peitz's Arthur Rubinstein – Farewell to Chopin from 2020 is dedicated to the legendary pianist and part of the ZDF/Arte series Magic Moments in Music.  Rubinstein's constant companion Annabelle Weidenfeld recalls his incredible charm, and youngest daughter Alina Rubinstein remembers the charismatic but often absent father whom she “wouldn’t trade for anyone in the world”. Rarely seen archive recordings provide fascinating insights into the family life of the Rubinsteins.   In 2022 Peitz directed another 2022 episode for “Magic Moments in Music” reflecting on Daniel Barenboim and the West-Eastern Divan Orchestra in Ramallah.  Also in 2022, Peitz explored a new music trend called Neo-Classical with the documentary The Sound Weavers: Ludovico Einaudi, Hauschka, Joep Beving, Hania Rani. The film portrays the most successful protagonists of the classical genre.

Filmography

as producer, production manager
2011 Die Singende Stadt
2014 A Tribute to Krzysztof Penderecki

as producer, writer
2012 John Cage – Journeys in Sound

as director, writer
2012 Sounds of the Sidewalk – On the Road with Buskers
2014 Satiesfictions – Promenades with Erik Satie
2016 Silenced – Composers in Revolutionary Russia
2018 The Unanswered Ives -- American Pioneer of Music
2020 From the Depths of the Soul – Foray through the Musical Landscape of Armenia
2021 Arthur Rubinstein – Farewell to Chopin
2021 The Sound Weavers: Ludovico Einaudi, Hauschka, Joep Beving, Hania Rani
2022 Daniel Barenboim and the West-Eastern Divan Orchestra in Ramallah

Documentary filmography/Awards

References

External links
 Anne-Kathrin Peitz at ACCENTUS Music
 
 
Anne-Kathrin Peitz at Crew United

Anne-Kathrin Peitz on Filmportal.de 

Anne-Kathrin Peitz at Rate Your Music

German documentary film directors
1972 births
Film people from Leipzig
Living people